Spain participated in the Eurovision Song Contest 2019 with the song "", performed by Miki and written by Adrià Salas. The Spanish broadcaster  (TVE) used the tenth series of reality television talent competition  as the platform to select the Spanish entry for the 2019 contest in Tel Aviv, Israel.

As a member of the "Big Five", Spain automatically qualified to compete in the final of the Eurovision Song Contest. Performing in position 26, Spain placed twenty-second out of the 26 participating countries with 54 points.

Background 

The nation has won the contest on two occasions: in 1968 with the song "La, la, la" performed by Massiel and in 1969 with the song "" performed by Salomé, the latter having won in a four-way tie with France, the Netherlands and the United Kingdom. Spain has also finished second four times, with Karina in 1971, Mocedades in 1973, Betty Missiego in 1979 and Anabel Conde in 1995. In 2018, Spain placed twenty-third out of twenty-six countries with the song "" performed by Amaia and Alfred.

The Spanish national broadcaster,  (TVE), broadcasts the event within Spain and organises the selection process for the nation's entry. The Spanish broadcaster had used both national finals and internal selection to choose the Spanish entry in the past. For 2018, TVE used the reality television singing competition  (the Spanish version of Star Academy) to select the artist and song to represent Spain in the contest, as they had previously done from 2002 to 2004. On 14 September 2018, TVE confirmed that the series would serve as the platform to select the Spanish entrant at the 2019 contest.

Before Eurovision

Operación Triunfo 2018

 is a Spanish reality television music competition consisting of training sixteen contestants in a boarding academy in order to find new singing talent. The tenth series, also known as  2018, took place from 19 September 2018 to 19 December 2018 at the Parc Audiovisual de Catalunya in Terrassa, Barcelona, hosted by Roberto Leal. The competition was broadcast on La 1, TVE International as well as online via TVE's official website rtve.es. During the  2018 press conference on 14 September 2018, TVE announced that the Spanish entry for the 2019 Eurovision Song Contest would be selected from the contestants competing on the ongoing series. The same method was used for the 2002, 2003, 2004 and 2018 contests. However, unlike previous editions, all sixteen contestants that entered the academy would be eligible to compete in the Eurovision selection show, on 20 January 2019. Three of the songs were selected by an Internet vote while seven additional songs were selected by an evaluation committee.

Contestants 
 2018 featured eighteen novel solo artists as contestants, of which sixteen were selected to enter "The Academy" following the introduction live show (Gala 0) on 19 September 2018. The sixteen contestants that entered the academy were also eligible to compete in Gala Eurovisión, however three of the contestants were not allocated any song and did not compete during the show.

Competing entries 
A submission period was open from 1 November 2018 until 15 November 2018. Songs were required to contain lyrics in one of the official languages of Spain. Songwriters could suggest the contestant(s) from  2018 they considered ideal to perform their songs, but the suggestion was not binding. In addition to the public call, established songwriters were invited by TVE and the production company Gestmusic to submit songs. At the conclusion of the submission period, 953 original songs were submitted by the public and over 100 original songs were submitted by invited songwriters. A five-member committee consisting of two music industry professionals, a member of the Spanish branch of the international OGAE fan club, a member of the Spanish AEV fan club and a member from RTVE Digital, the digital branch of the broadcaster, evaluated the songs received from the public call and selected up to ten songs for an Internet vote. An alternate five-member committee consisting of two members of TVE's management, two teachers from the  2018 Academy and a member from RTVE Digital, evaluated the songs received from the invited songwriters and selected up to ten additional songs for the Internet vote. A total of seventeen songs were selected and then allocated to thirteen of the eligible contestants of  2018 either as solo artists or in duet combinations. The competing songs and the allocations were announced on 11 December 2018 and the contestants recorded one-minute demo versions of their songs. The demos were premiered via rtve.es on 19 December 2018.

Internet vote 

 Internet vote qualifier Evaluation committee qualifier

Gala Eurovisión 
 took place on 20 January 2019. The winner, "" performed by Miki, was selected exclusively through a public vote via telephone, SMS and the official  app.

The four members of the expert panel that commented on the entries were:

  – musician, music executive, artistic director at Universal Music Spain
 Pastora Soler – singer, represented Spain in the 2012 contest
 Tony Aguilar – radio DJ, television presenter, Spanish commentator for the Eurovision Song Contest
 Doron Medalie – Israeli songwriter, composer, artistic director, winning songwriter of the Eurovision Song Contest 2018

In addition to the performances of the competing entries, guest performer was runner-up of the Eurovision Song Contest 2018 for Cyprus Eleni Foureira who performed "" and "". The competing artists performed the winning song of the Eurovision Song Contest 2018 for Israel "Toy", and Alfred García who represented Spain in the Spain in the 2018 contest together with Amaia Romero was also present to announce the winner.

Preparation
The official video of the song, directed by Adrià Pujol and Fèlix Cortés, was filmed on 13 February 2019 at the Mercantic antique market in Sant Cugat del Vallès, Barcelona and was released on 7 March 2019.

Promotion
Miki made appearances across Europe to specifically promote "" as the Spanish Eurovision entry. He performed at the Eurovision in Concert event at the AFAS Live venue in Amsterdam, Netherlands on 6 April; the London Eurovision Party at the Café de Paris venue in London, United Kingdom on 14 April, and the Moscow Eurovision Party at the Vegas City Hall venue in Moscow, Russia on 24 April.

In addition to his international appearances, Miki performed "" as a guest on competitive dance reality television series , aired on #0, on 26 March. On 30 March, he performed the song at the Plaza de Oriente in Madrid on occasion of the Earth Hour. On 20 April, he performed during the Eurovision-Spain Pre-Party event which was held at the Sala La Riviera venue in Madrid. On 8 May, the special concert event , which aired on TVE's official website and YouTube channel, centered on him, accompanied by guest performers.

At Eurovision 
The Eurovision Song Contest 2019 took place at Expo Tel Aviv in Tel Aviv, Israel and consisted of two semi-finals on 14 and 16 May and the final on 18 May 2019. According to Eurovision rules, all nations with the exceptions of the host country and the "Big Five" (France, Germany, Italy, Spain and the United Kingdom) are required to qualify from one of two semi-finals in order to compete for the final; the top ten countries from each semi-final progress to the final. As a member of the "Big Five", Spain automatically qualifies to compete in the final. In addition to their participation in the final, Spain is also required to broadcast and vote in one of the two semi-finals. During the semifinal allocation draw on 28 January 2019, Spain was allocated to air and vote in the first semi-final on 14 May.

For the second consecutive year, the final was broadcast live in cinemas across the country due to an agreement with cinema chain Cinesa. The Spanish spokesperson, who announced the top 12-point score awarded by the Spanish jury during the final, was Nieves Álvarez, for the third year in a row. The Spanish song placed 22nd in the final with 54 points.

Staging and performance 
The staging director for the Spanish performance was Fokas Evangelinos, who had previously worked with the delegations of Greece, Russia, Ukraine, Belarus and Azerbaijan in a similar role, including the winning performances of Greece in the 2005 contest and Russia in the 2008 contest. Miki was joined in stage by backing singers and dancers Mikel Hennet (who represented Spain in the 2007 Contest as part of D'Nash), Ernesto Santos, Fran Guerrero, María Acosta and Mary Martínez.

Voting
Voting during the three shows involved each country awarding two sets of points from 1–8, 10 and 12: one from their professional jury and the other from televoting. Each nation's jury consisted of five music industry professionals who are citizens of the country they represent, with their names published before the contest to ensure transparency. This jury judged each entry based on: vocal capacity; the stage performance; the song's composition and originality; and the overall impression by the act. In addition, no member of a national jury was permitted to be related in any way to any of the competing acts in such a way that they cannot vote impartially and independently. The individual rankings of each jury member, as well as the nation's televoting results, were released shortly after the grand final.

Points awarded to Spain

Points awarded by Spain

Detailed voting results
The following members comprised the Spanish jury:
  (Sole Giménez; jury chairperson)composer, author, singer
 Elena Gómezradio music coordination at Radio 3 
  (Ricky Merino)singer, dancer, television host
  (Raúl Gómez)composer, singer, pianist
 songwriter, producer, represented Spain in the 2013 contest as member of El Sueño de Morfeo

References

External links
 Official TVE Eurovision site

2019
Countries in the Eurovision Song Contest 2019
Eurovision
Eurovision